The Brontës were a nineteenth-century literary family, born in the village of Thornton and later associated with the village of Haworth in the West Riding of Yorkshire, England. The sisters, Charlotte (1816–1855), Emily (1818–1848) and Anne (1820–1849), are well-known poets and novelists. Like many contemporary female writers, they published their poems and novels under male pseudonyms: Currer, Ellis, and Acton Bell. Their stories attracted attention for their passion and originality immediately following their publication. Charlotte's Jane Eyre was the first to know success, while Emily's Wuthering Heights, Anne's The Tenant of Wildfell Hall and other works were accepted as masterpieces of literature later.

The first Brontë children to be born to rector Patrick Brontë and his wife Maria were Maria (1814–1825) and Elizabeth (1815–1825), who both died at young ages due to disease. Charlotte, Emily and Anne were then born within a time period of approximately four years. These three sisters and their brother, Branwell (1817–1848), who had been born after Charlotte and before Emily, were very close to each other. As children, they developed their imaginations first through oral storytelling and play, set in an intricate imaginary world, and then through the collaborative writing of increasingly complex stories set in their fictional world. The deaths of their mother and two older sisters marked them and influenced their writing profoundly, as did their isolated upbringing. They were raised in a religious family. The Brontë birthplace in Thornton is a place of pilgrimage and their later home, the parsonage at Haworth in Yorkshire, now the Brontë Parsonage Museum, has hundreds of thousands of visitors each year.

Origin of the name 
The Brontë family can be traced to the Irish clan Ó Pronntaigh, which literally means "descendant of Pronntach". They were a family of hereditary scribes and literary men in Fermanagh. The version Ó Proinntigh, which was first given by Patrick Woulfe in his  and reproduced without question by Edward MacLysaght inter alia, cannot be accepted as correct, as there were a number of well-known scribes with this name writing in Irish in the 17th and 18th centuries and all of them used the spelling Ó Pronntaigh.

At some point, Patrick Brontë (born Brunty), the sisters' father, decided on the alternative spelling with the diaeresis over the terminal  to indicate that the name has two syllables. Multiple theories exist to account for the change as well, including that he may have wished to hide his humble origins. As a man of letters, he would have been familiar with classical Greek and may have chosen the name after the Greek . One view, which biographer C. K. Shorter proposed in 1896, is that he adapted his name to associate himself with Admiral Horatio Nelson, who was also Duke of Bronte. One might also find evidence for this theory in Patrick Brontë's desire to associate himself with the Duke of Wellington in his form of dress.

Family tree

Members of the Brontë family

Patrick Brontë 

Patrick Brontë (17 March 1777 – 7 June 1861), the Brontë sisters' father, was born in Loughbrickland, County Down, Ireland, of a family of farm workers of moderate means. His birth name was Patrick Prunty or Brunty. His mother, Alice McClory, was of the Roman Catholic faith, whilst his father Hugh was a Protestant, and Patrick was brought up in his father's faith.

He was a bright young man and, after studying under the Rev. Thomas Tighe, won a scholarship to St John's College, Cambridge. There, he studied divinity, ancient history and modern history. Attending Cambridge may have made him feel that his name was too Irish and he changed its spelling to Brontë (and its pronunciation accordingly), perhaps in honour of Horatio Nelson, whom Patrick admired. It is more likely, however, that his brother William was 'on the run' from the authorities for his involvement with the radical United Irishmen, leading Patrick to distance himself from the name Prunty. Having obtained a Bachelor of Arts degree, he was ordained on 10 August 1806. He is the author of Cottage Poems (1811), The Rural Minstrel (1814), numerous pamphlets, several newspaper articles and various rural poems.

In 1811, Patrick was appointed minister at Hartshead-cum-Clifton. In 1812, he met and married 29 year old Maria Branwell at Guiseley. In 1813, they moved to Clough House Hightown, Liversedge, West Riding of Yorkshire and by 1820 they had moved into the parsonage at Haworth, where he took up the post of perpetual curate. (Haworth was an ancient chapelry in the large parish of Bradford, so he could not be rector or vicar.) They had six children. On the death of his wife in 1821, his sister-in-law, Elizabeth Branwell, came from Penzance, Cornwall, to help him bring up the children. Open, intelligent, generous and dedicated to educating his children personally, he bought all the books and toys the children desired. He also accorded them great freedom and unconditional love, although he may have alienated them from the world due to his eccentric personal habits and peculiar theories of education.

After several failed attempts to remarry, Patrick accepted permanent widowerhood at the age of 47, and spent his time visiting the sick and the poor, giving sermons and administering communion. In so doing, he would often leave his children Maria, Elizabeth, Emily, Charlotte, Branwell and Anne alone with Elizabeth—Aunt Branwell and a maid, Tabitha Aykroyd (Tabby). Tabby helped relieve their possible boredom and loneliness especially by recounting local legends in her Yorkshire dialect as she tirelessly prepared the family's meals. Eventually, Patrick would survive his entire family. Six years after Charlotte's death, he died in 1861 at the age of 84. His son-in-law, the Rev. Arthur Bell Nicholls, would aid Mr Brontë at the end of his life as well.

Maria, née Branwell 

Patrick's wife Maria Brontë, née Branwell (15 April 1783 – 15 September 1821), was born in Penzance, Cornwall, and came from a comfortably well-off, middle-class family. Her father had a flourishing tea and grocery store and had accumulated considerable wealth. Maria died at the age of 38 of uterine cancer. She married the same day as her younger sister Charlotte in the church at Guiseley after her fiancé had celebrated the union of two other couples. She was a literate and pious woman, known for her lively spirit, joyfulness and tenderness, and it was she who designed the samplers that are on display in the museum  and had them embroidered by her children. She left memories with her husband and with Charlotte, the oldest surviving sibling, of a very vivacious woman. The younger ones, particularly Emily and Anne, admitted to retaining only vague images of their mother, especially of her suffering on her sickbed.

Elizabeth Branwell 

Elizabeth Branwell (2 December 1776 – 29 October 1842) arrived from Penzance in 1821, aged 45, after her younger sister Maria's death, to help Patrick look after the children, to whom she was known as 'Aunt Branwell.' Elizabeth Branwell was a Methodist, though it seems that her denomination did not exert any influence on the children. It was Aunt Branwell who taught the children arithmetic, the alphabet, and how to sew, embroider and cross-stitch, skills appropriate for ladies. Aunt Branwell also gave them books and subscribed to Fraser's Magazine, less interesting than Blackwood's, but, nevertheless, providing plenty of material for discussion. She was a generous person who dedicated her life to her nieces and nephew, neither marrying nor returning to visit her relations in Cornwall. She died of bowel obstruction in October 1842, after a brief agony during which she was comforted by her beloved nephew Branwell. In her last will, Aunt Branwell left to her three nieces the considerable sum of £900 (about £95,700 in 2017 currency), which allowed them to resign from their low-paid jobs as governesses and teachers.

Children 

 Maria (1814–1825), the eldest, was born in Clough House, Hightown, Liversedge, West Yorkshire, on 23 April 1814. She suffered from hunger, cold, and privation at Cowan Bridge School. Charlotte described her as very lively, very sensitive, and particularly advanced in her reading. She returned from school with an advanced case of tuberculosis and died at Haworth aged 11 on 6 May 1825.
 Elizabeth (1815–1825), the second child, joined her sister Maria at Cowan Bridge where she suffered the same fate. Elizabeth was less vivacious than her brother and sisters and apparently less advanced for her age. She died on 15 June 1825 aged 10, within two weeks of returning home to her father.
 Charlotte (1816–1855), born in Market Street Thornton, near Bradford, West Riding of Yorkshire, on 21 April 1816, was a poet and novelist and is the author of Jane Eyre, her best-known work, and three other novels. She died on 31 March 1855 just before reaching the age of 39.
 Patrick Branwell (1817–1848) was born in Market Street Thornton on 26 June 1817. Known as Branwell, he was a painter, writer, and casual worker. He became addicted to alcohol and laudanum and died at Haworth on 24 September 1848 aged 31.
 Emily Jane (1818–1848), born in Market Street Thornton, 30 July 1818, was a poet and novelist. She died in Haworth on 19 December 1848 aged 30. Wuthering Heights was her only novel.
 Anne (1820–1849), born in Market Street Thornton on 17 January 1820, was a poet and novelist. She wrote a largely autobiographical novel entitled Agnes Grey, but her second novel, The Tenant of Wildfell Hall (1848), was far more ambitious. She died on 28 May 1849 in Scarborough aged 29.

Education

Cowan Bridge School 
In 1824, the four eldest girls (excluding Anne) entered the Clergy Daughters' School at Cowan Bridge, which educated the children of less prosperous members of the clergy, and had been recommended to Mr Brontë. The following year, Maria and Elizabeth fell gravely ill and were removed from the school, but died on 6 May and 15 June 1825, respectively. Charlotte and Emily were also withdrawn from the school and returned to Haworth. Charlotte expressed the traumatic impact that her sisters' deaths had on her in her future works. In Jane Eyre, Cowan Bridge became Lowood, Maria inspired the young Helen Burns, the cruel mistress Miss Andrews inspired the headmistress Miss Scatcherd, and the tyrannical headmaster Rev. Carus Wilson, Mr Brocklehurst.

Tuberculosis, which afflicted Maria and Elizabeth in 1825, also caused the eventual deaths of three of the surviving Brontës: Branwell in September 1848, Emily in December 1848, and, finally, Anne in May 1849.

Patrick Brontë faced a challenge in arranging for the education of the girls of his family, which was barely middle class. They lacked significant connections and he could not afford the fees for them to attend an established school for young ladies. One solution was the schools where the fees were reduced to a minimum—so called "charity schools"—with a mission to assist families like those of the lower clergy. One cannot accuse Mr. Brontë of not having done everything possible to find a solution that he thought would be best for his daughters. 

(Barker had read in the Leeds Intelligencer of 6 November 1823 reports of cases in the Court of Commons in Bowes: he later read of other cases, of 24 November 1824 near Richmond, in the county of Yorkshire, where pupils had been discovered gnawed by rats and suffering so badly from malnutrition that some of them had lost their sight.) Yet for Patrick, there was nothing to suggest that the Reverend Carus Wilson's Clergy Daughters' School would not provide a good education and good care for his daughters. The school was not expensive and its patrons (supporters who allowed the school to use their names) were all respected people. Among these was the daughter of Hannah More, a religious author and philanthropist who took a particular interest in education. Mrs More was a close friend of the poet William Cowper, who, like her, advocated extensive, proper and well-rounded education for young girls. The pupils included the offspring of different prelates and even certain acquaintances of Patrick Brontë including William Wilberforce, young women whose fathers had also been educated at St John's College, Cambridge. Thus Brontë believed Wilson's school to have many of the necessary guarantees needed for his daughters to receive proper schooling.

John Bradley 

In 1829–30, Patrick Brontë engaged John Bradley, an artist from neighbouring Keighley, as drawing-master for the children. Bradley was an artist of some local repute rather than a professional instructor, but he may well have fostered Branwell's enthusiasm for art and architecture.

Miss Wooler's school 

In 1831, fourteen-year-old Charlotte was enrolled at the school of Miss Wooler in Roe Head, Mirfield. Patrick could have sent his daughter to a less costly school in Keighley nearer home but Miss Wooler and her sisters had a good reputation and he remembered the building, which he passed when strolling around the parishes of Kirklees, Dewsbury and Hartshead-cum-Clifton where he was vicar. Margaret Wooler showed fondness towards the sisters and she accompanied Charlotte to the altar at her marriage. Patrick's choice of school was excellent—Charlotte was happy there and studied well. She made many lifelong friends, in particular Ellen Nussey and Mary Taylor who later went to New Zealand before returning to England. Charlotte returned from Roe Head in June 1832, missing her friends, but happy to rejoin her family.

Three years later, Miss Wooler offered her former pupil a position as her assistant. The family decided that Emily would accompany her to pursue studies that would otherwise have been unaffordable. Emily's fees were partly covered by Charlotte's salary. Emily was 17 and it was the first time she had left Haworth since leaving Cowan Bridge. On 29 July 1835, the sisters left for Roe Head. The same day, Branwell wrote a letter to the Royal Academy of Art in London, to present several of his drawings as part of his candidature as a probationary student.

Charlotte taught, and wrote about her students without much sympathy. Emily did not settle: after three months her health seemed to decline and she had to be taken home to the parsonage. Anne took her place and stayed until Christmas 1837.

Charlotte avoided boredom by following the developments of the imaginary Empire of Angria—invented by Charlotte and Bramwell—that she received in letters from her brother. During holidays at Haworth, she wrote long narratives while being reproached by her father who wanted her to become more involved in parish affairs. These were coming to a head over the imposition of the Church of England rates, a local tax levied on parishes where the majority of the population were dissenters. In the meantime, Miss Wooler moved to Heald's House, at Dewsbury Moor, where Charlotte complained about the humidity that made her unwell. Upon leaving the establishment in 1838 Miss Wooler presented her with a parting gift of The Vision of Don Roderick and Rokeby, a collection of poems by Walter Scott.

Literary evolution 
The children became interested in writing from an early age, initially as a game. They all displayed a talent for narrative, but for the younger ones it became a pastime to develop them. At the centre of the children's creativity were twelve wooden soldiers which Patrick Brontë gave to Branwell at the beginning of June 1826. These toy soldiers instantly fired their imaginations and they spoke of them as the Young Men, and gave them names. However, it was not until December 1827 that their ideas took written form, and the imaginary African kingdom of Glass Town came into existence, followed by the Empire of Angria. Emily and Anne created Gondal, an island continent in the North Pacific, ruled by a woman, after the departure of Charlotte in 1831. In the beginning, these stories were written in little books, the size of a matchbox  and cursorily bound with thread. The pages were filled with close, minute writing, often in capital letters without punctuation and embellished with illustrations, detailed maps, schemes, landscapes and plans of buildings, created by the children according to their specialisations. The idea was that the books were of a size for the soldiers to read. The complexity of the stories matured as the children's imaginations developed, fed by reading the three weekly or monthly magazines to which their father had subscribed, or the newspapers that were bought daily from John Greenwood's local news and stationery store.

Literary and artistic influence 
These fictional worlds were the product of fertile imagination fed by reading, discussion and a passion for literature. Far from suffering from the negative influences that never left them and which were reflected in the works of their later, more mature years, the Brontë children absorbed them with open arms.

Press 
The periodicals that Patrick Brontë read were a mine of information for his children. The Leeds Intelligencer and Blackwood's Edinburgh Magazine, conservative and well written, but better than the Quarterly Review that defended the same political ideas whilst addressing a less-refined readership (the reason Mr. Brontë did not read it), were exploited in every detail. Blackwood's Magazine, in particular, was not only the source of their knowledge of world affairs, but also provided material for the Brontës' early writing. For instance, an article in the June 1826 number of Blackwood's, provides commentary on new discoveries from the exploration of central Africa. The map included with the article highlights geographical features the Brontës reference in their tales: the Jibbel Kumera (the Mountains of the Moon), Ashantee, and the rivers Niger and Calabar. The author also advises the British to expand into Africa from Fernando Po, where, Christine Alexander notes, the Brontë children locate the Great Glass Town. Their knowledge of geography was completed by Goldsmith's Grammar of General Geography, which the Brontës owned and annotated heavily.

Lord Byron 
From 1833, Charlotte and Branwell's Angrian tales begin to feature Byronic heroes who have a strong sexual magnetism and passionate spirit, and demonstrate arrogance and even black-heartedness. Again, it is in an article in Blackwood's Magazine from August 1825 that they discover the poet for the first time; he had died the previous year. From this moment, the name Byron became synonymous with all the prohibitions and audacities as if it had stirred up the very essence of the rise of those forbidden things. Branwell's Charlotte Zamorna, one of the heroes of Verdopolis, tends towards increasingly ambiguous behaviour, and the same influence and evolution recur with the Brontës, especially in the characters of Heathcliff in Wuthering Heights, and Mr. Rochester in Jane Eyre, who display the traits of a Byronic hero. Numerous other works left their mark on the Brontës—the Thousand and One Nights, for example, which inspired jinn in which they became themselves in the centre of their kingdoms, while adding a touch of exoticism.

John Martin 

The children's imagination was also influenced by three prints of engravings in mezzotint by John Martin around 1820. Charlotte and Branwell made copies of the prints Belshazzar's Feast, Déluge, and Joshua Commanding the Sun to Stand Still upon Gibeon (1816), which hung on the walls of the parsonage.

Martin's fantastic architecture is reflected in the Glass Town and Angrian writings, where he appears himself among Branwell's characters and under the name of Edward de Lisle, the greatest painter and portraitist of Verdopolis, the capital of Glass Town. One of Sir Edward de Lisle's major works, Les Quatre Genii en Conseil, is inspired by Martin's illustration for John Milton's Paradise Lost. Together with Byron, John Martin seems to have been one of the artistic influences essential to the Brontës' universe.

Anne's morals and realism 
The influence revealed by Agnes Grey and The Tenant of Wildfell Hall is much less clear. Anne's works are largely founded on her experience as a governess and on that of her brother's decline. Furthermore, they demonstrate her conviction, a legacy from her father, that books should provide moral education. This sense of moral duty and the need to record it, are more evident in The Tenant of Wildfell Hall. The influence of the gothic novels of Ann Radcliffe, Horace Walpole, Gregory "Monk" Lewis and Charles Maturin is noticeable, and that of Walter Scott too, if only because the heroine, abandoned and left alone, resists importunities not only through her almost supernatural talents, but by her powerful temperament.

Jane Eyre, Agnes Grey, The Tenant of Wildfell Hall, Shirley, Villette and even The Professor present a linear structure concerning characters who advance through life after several trials and tribulations, to find a kind of happiness in love and virtue, recalling works of religious inspiration of the 17th century such as John Bunyan's The Pilgrim's Progress or his Grace abounding to the Chief of Sinners. In a more profane manner, the hero or heroine follows a picaresque itinerary such as in Miguel de Cervantes (1547–1616), Daniel Defoe (1660–1731), Henry Fielding (1707–1764) and Tobias Smollett (1721–1771). This lively tradition continued into the 19th century with the rags to riches genre to which almost all the great Victorian romancers have contributed. The protagonist is thrown by fate into poverty and after many difficulties achieves a golden happiness. Often an artifice is employed to effect the passage from one state to another such as an unexpected inheritance, a miraculous gift, grand reunions, etc, and in a sense it is the route followed by Charlotte's and Anne's protagonists, even if the riches they win are more those of the heart than of the wallet. Apart from its Gothic elements, Wuthering Heights moves like a Greek tragedy and possesses its music, the cosmic dimensions of the epics of John Milton, and the power of the Shakespearian theatre. One can hear the echoes of King Lear as well as the completely different characters of Romeo and Juliet. The Brontës were also seduced by the writings of Walter Scott, and in 1834 Charlotte exclaimed, "For fiction, read Walter Scott and only him—all novels after his are without value."

Governesses and Charlotte's idea

Early teaching opportunities
 Through their father's influence and their own intellectual curiosity, they were able to benefit from an education that placed them among knowledgeable people, but Mr Brontë's emoluments were modest. The only options open to the girls were either marriage or a choice between the professions of school mistress or governess. The Brontë sisters found positions in families wherein they educated often rebellious young children, or found employment as school teachers. The possibility of becoming a paid companion to a rich and solitary woman might have been a fall-back role but one that would have probably bored any of the sisters intolerably. Janet Todd's Mary Wollstonecraft, a revolutionary life mentions the predicament. 

Only Emily never became a governess. Her sole professional experience would be an experiment in teaching during six months of intolerable exile in Miss Patchett's school at Law Hill (between Haworth and Halifax). In contrast, Charlotte had teaching positions at Miss Margaret Wooler's school and in Brussels with the Hégers. She became governess to the Sidgwicks, the Stonegappes and the Lotherdales where she worked for several months in 1839, then with Mrs White, at Upperhouse House, Rawdon, from March to September 1841. Anne became a governess and worked for Mrs Ingham, at Blake Hall, Mirfield from April to December 1839, then for Mrs Robinson at Thorp Green Hall, Little Ouseburn, near York, where she also obtained employment for her brother in a futile attempt to stabilise him.

Working as governesses 
The family's finances did not flourish, and Aunt Branwell spent the money with caution. Emily had a visceral need of her home and the countryside that surrounded it, and to leave it would cause her to languish and wither. Charlotte and Anne, being more realistic, did not hesitate in finding work and from April 1839 to December 1841 the two sisters had several posts as governesses. Not staying long with each family, their employment would last for some months or a single season. However, Anne did stay with the Robinsons in Thorp Green where things went well, from May 1840 to June 1845.

In the meantime, Charlotte had an idea that would place all the advantages on her side. On advice from her father and friends, she thought that she and her sisters had the intellectual capacity to create a school for young girls in the parsonage where their Sunday School classes took place. It was agreed to offer the future pupils the opportunity of correctly learning modern languages and that preparation for this should be done abroad, which led to a further decision. Among the possibilities, Paris and Lille were considered, but were rejected due to aversion to the French. Indeed, the French revolution and the Napoleonic wars had not been forgotten by the Tory-spirited and deeply conservative girls. On the recommendation of a pastor based in Brussels, who wanted to be of help, Belgium was chosen, where they could also study German and music. Aunt Branwell provided the funds for the Brussels project.

School project and study trip to Brussels

Charlotte's and Emily's journey to Brussels 

Emily and Charlotte arrived in Brussels in February 1842 accompanied by their father. Once there, they enrolled at Monsieur and Madame Héger's boarding school in the Rue d'Isabelle, for six months. Claire Héger was the second wife of Constantin, and it was she who founded and directed the school while Constantin had the responsibility for the higher French classes. According to Miss Wheelwright, a former pupil, he had the intellect of a genius. He was passionate about his auditorium, demanding many lectures, perspectives, and structured analyses. He was also a good-looking man with regular features, bushy hair, very black whiskers, and wore an excited expression while sounding forth on great authors about whom he invited his students to make a pastiche on general or philosophical themes.

The lessons, especially those of Constantin Héger, were very much appreciated by Charlotte, and the two sisters showed exceptional intelligence, although Emily hardly liked her teacher and was somewhat rebellious. Emily learned German and to play the piano with natural brilliance and very quickly the two sisters were writing literary and philosophical essays in an advanced level of French. After six months of study, Mme Héger suggested they stay at the boarding school free of charge, in return for giving some lessons. After much hesitation, the girls accepted. Neither of them felt particularly attached to their students, and only one, Mademoiselle de Bassompierre, then aged 16, later expressed any affection for her teacher Emily, which appeared to be mutual, and made her a gift of a signed, detailed drawing of a storm ravaged pine tree.

Return and recall 
The death of their aunt in October of the same year forced them to return once more to Haworth. Aunt Branwell had left all her worldly goods in equal shares to her nieces and to Eliza Kingston, a cousin in Penzance, which had the immediate effect of purging all their debts and providing a small reserve of funds. Nevertheless, they were asked to return to the Heger's boarding school in Brussels as they were regarded as being competent and were needed. They were each offered teaching posts in the boarding school, English for Charlotte and music for Emily. However, Charlotte returned alone to Belgium in January 1843. Emily remained critical of Monsieur Heger, in spite of the excellent opinion he held of her. He later stated that she 'had the spirit of a man', and would probably become a great traveller due to her being gifted with a superior faculty of reason that allowed her to deduce ancient knowledge from new spheres of knowledge, and her unbending willpower would have triumphed over all obstacles.

Charlotte returns 
Almost a year to the day, enamoured for some time for Monsieur Héger, Charlotte resigned and returned to Haworth. Her life at the school had not been without suffering, and on one occasion she ventured into the cathedral and entered a confessional. She may have had intention of converting to Catholicism, but it would only have been for a short time. During her absence, life at Haworth had become more difficult. Mr. Brontë had lost his sight although his cataract had been operated on with success in Manchester, and it was there in August 1846, when Charlotte arrived at his bedside that she began to write Jane Eyre. Meanwhile, her brother Branwell fell into a rapid decline punctuated by dramas, drunkenness and delirium. Due partly to Branwell's poor reputation, the school project failed and was abandoned.

Charlotte wrote four long, very personal, and sometimes vague letters to Monsieur Héger that never received replies. The extent of Charlotte Brontë's feelings for Héger were not fully realised until 1913, when her letters to him were published for the first time. Héger had first shown them to Mrs. Gaskell when she visited him in 1856 while researching her biography The Life of Charlotte Brontë, but she concealed their true significance. These letters, referred to as the "Héger Letters", had been ripped up at some stage by Héger, but his wife had retrieved the pieces from the wastepaper bin and meticulously glued or sewn them back together. Paul Héger, Constantin's son, and his sisters gave these letters to the British Museum, and they were shortly thereafter printed in The Times newspaper.

Brontë sisters' literary career

First publication: Poems, by Currer, Ellis, and Acton Bell 

The writing that had begun so early never left the family. Charlotte had ambition like her brother, and wrote to the poet laureate Robert Southey to submit several poems in his style (though Branwell was kept at a distance from her project). She received a hardly encouraging reply after several months. Southey, still illustrious today although his star has somewhat waned, was one of the great figures of English Romanticism, along with William Wordsworth and Samuel Taylor Coleridge, and he shared the prejudice of the times; literature, or more particularly poetry (for women had been publishing fiction and enjoying critical, popular and economic success for over a century by this time), was considered a man's business, and not an appropriate occupation for ladies.

However, Charlotte did not allow herself to be discouraged. Furthermore, coincidence came to her aid. One day in autumn 1845 while alone in the dining room she noticed a small notebook lying open in the drawer of Emily's portable writing desk and "of my sister Emily's handwriting". She read it and was dazzled by the beauty of the poems that she did not know. The discovery of this treasure was what she recalled five years later, and according to Juliet Barker, she erased the excitement that she had felt "more than surprise ..., a deep conviction that these were not common effusions, nor at all like the poetry women generally write. I thought them condensed and terse, vigorous and genuine. To my ear, they had a peculiar music—wild, melancholy, and elevating." In the following paragraph Charlotte describes her sister's indignant reaction at her having ventured into such an intimate realm with impunity. It took Emily hours to calm down and days to be convinced to publish the poems.

Charlotte envisaged a joint publication by the three sisters. Anne was easily won over to the project, and the work was shared, compared and edited. Once the poems had been chosen, nineteen for Charlotte and twenty-one each for Anne and Emily, Charlotte went about searching for a publisher. She took advice from William and Robert Chambers of Edinburgh, directors of one of their favourite magazines, Chambers's Edinburgh Journal. It is thought, although no documents exist to support the claim, that they advised the sisters to contact Aylott & Jones, a small publishing house at 8, Paternoster Row, London, who accepted, but at the authors' own risk since they felt the commercial risk to the company was too great. The work thus appeared in 1846, published using the male pseudonyms of Currer (Charlotte), Ellis (Emily) and Acton (Anne) Bell. These were very uncommon forenames but the initials of each of the sisters were preserved and the patronym could have been inspired by that of the vicar of the parish, Arthur Bell Nicholls. It was in fact on 18 May 1845 that he took up his duties at Haworth, at the moment when the publication project was well advanced.

The book attracted hardly any attention. Only three copies were sold, of which one was purchased by Fredrick Enoch, a resident of Cornmarket, Warwick, who in admiration, wrote to the publisher to request an autograph—the only extant single document carrying the three authors' signatures in their pseudonyms, and they continued creating their prose, each one producing a book a year later. Each worked in secret, unceasingly discussing their writing for hours at the dinner table, after which their father would open the door at 9 p.m. with "Don't stay up late, girls!", then rewinding the clock and taking the stairs up to his room.

Fame

1847 
Charlotte's Jane Eyre, Emily's Wuthering Heights and Anne's Agnes Grey appeared in 1847 after many tribulations, again for reasons of finding a publisher. The packets containing the manuscripts were often returned to the parsonage and Charlotte simply added a new address; she did this at least a dozen times during the year. The first one was finally published by Smith, Elder & Co in London. The 23-year-old owner, George Smith, had specialised in publishing scientific revues, aided by his perspicacious reader William Smith Williams. Emily and Anne's manuscripts were confided to Thomas Cautley Newby, who intended to compile a three-decker; more economical for sale and for loan in the "circulating libraries". The two first volumes included Wuthering Heights and the third one Agnes Grey. Both novels attracted critical acclaim, occasionally harsh about Wuthering Heights, praised for the originality of the subject and its narrative style, but viewed with suspicion because of its outrageous violence and immorality—surely, the critics wrote, a work of a man with a depraved mind. Critics were fairly neutral about Agnes Grey, but more flattering for Jane Eyre, which soon became a best-seller, despite some commentators denouncing it as an affront to good morals.

Jane Eyre and rising fame 

The pseudonymous (Currer Bell) publication in 1847 of Jane Eyre, An Autobiography established a dazzling reputation for Charlotte. In July 1848, Charlotte and Anne (Emily had refused to go along with them) travelled by train to London to prove to Smith, Elder & Co. that each sister was indeed an independent author, for Thomas Cautley Newby, the publisher of Wuthering Heights and Agnes Grey, had launched a rumour that the three novels were the work of one author, understood to be Ellis Bell (Emily). George Smith was extremely surprised to find two gawky, ill-dressed country girls paralysed with fear, who, to identify themselves, held out the letters addressed to Messrs. Acton, Currer and Ellis Bell. Taken by such surprise, he introduced them to his mother with all the dignity their talent merited, and invited them to the opera for a performance of Rossini's Barber of Seville.

Wuthering Heights 

Emily Brontë's Wuthering Heights was published in 1847 under the masculine pseudonym Ellis Bell, by Thomas Cautley Newby, in two companion volumes to that of Anne's (Acton Bell), Agnes Grey. Controversial from the start of its release, its originality, its subject, narrative style and troubled action raised intrigue. Certain critics condemned it, but sales were nevertheless considerable for an unknown author of a novel that defied all conventions.

It is a work of black Romanticism, covering three generations isolated in the cold spring of the countryside with two opposing elements: the dignified manor of Thrushcross Grange and the rambling dilapidated pile of Wuthering Heights. The main characters, swept by tumults of the earth, the skies and the hearts, are strange and often possessed of unheard-of violence and deprivations. The story is told in a scholarly fashion, with two narrators, the traveller and tenant Lockwood, and the housekeeper/governess, Nelly Dean, with two sections in the first person, one direct, one cloaked, which overlap each other with digressions and sub-plots that form, from apparently scattered fragments, a coherently locked unit.

1848, Anne's The Tenant of Wildfell Hall 

One year before her death in May 1849, Anne published a second novel. Far more ambitious than her previous novel, The Tenant of Wildfell Hall was a great success and rapidly outsold Emily's Wuthering Heights. However, the critical reception was mixed—praise for the novel's "power" and "effect" and sharp criticism for being "coarse". Charlotte Brontë herself, Anne's sister, wrote to her publisher that it "hardly seems to me desirable to  choice of subject in that work is a mistake." After Anne's death, Charlotte prevented the novel's republication and thus condemned her sister to temporary oblivion.

The master theme is the alcoholism of a man who causes the downfall of his family. Helen Graham, the central character, gets married for love to Arthur Huntingdon, whom she soon discovers to be lecherous, violent and alcoholic. She is forced to break with the conventions that would keep her in the family home that has become hell, and to leave with her child to seek secret refuge in the old house of Wildfell Hall. When the alcohol causes her husband's ultimate decline, she returns to care for him in total abnegation until his death.

Today, The Tenant of Wildfell Hall is considered by most of the critics to be one of the first sustained feminist novels.

Identities revealed 
In 1850, a little over a year after the deaths of Emily and Anne, Charlotte wrote a preface for the re-print of the combined edition of Wuthering Heights and Agnes Grey, in which she publicly revealed the real identities of all three sisters.

Charlotte Brontë

Denunciation of boarding schools (Jane Eyre) 
Conditions at the school at Cowan Bridge, where Maria and Elizabeth may have contracted the tuberculosis from which they died, were probably no worse than those at many other schools of the time. (For example, several decades before the Brontë sisters' experience at Cowan Bridge, Jane Austen and her sister Cassandra contracted typhus at a similar boarding school, and Jane nearly died. The Austen sisters' education, like that of the Brontë sisters, was continued at home.) Nevertheless, Charlotte blamed Cowan Bridge for her sisters' deaths, especially its poor medical care—chiefly, repeated emetics and blood-lettings—and the negligence of the school's doctor, who was the director's brother-in-law. Charlotte's vivid memories of the privations at Cowan Bridge were poured into her depiction of Lowood School in Jane Eyre: the scanty and often spoiled food, the lack of heating and adequate clothing, the periodic epidemics of illness such as "low fever" (probably typhus), the severity and arbitrariness of the punishments, and even the harshness of particular teachers (a Miss Andrews who taught at Cowan Bridge is thought to have been Charlotte's model for Miss Scatcherd in Jane Eyre). Elizabeth Gaskell, a personal friend and the first biographer of Charlotte, confirmed that Cowan Bridge was Charlotte's model for Lowood and insisted that conditions there in Charlotte's day were egregious. More recent biographers have argued that the food, clothing, heating, medical care and discipline at Cowan Bridge were not considered sub-standard for religious schools of the time, testaments of the era's complacency about these intolerable conditions. One scholar has commended Patrick Brontë for his perspicacity in removing all his daughters from the school, a few weeks before the deaths of Maria and Elizabeth.

Literary encounters 
Following the overwhelming success of Jane Eyre, Charlotte was pressured by George Smith, her publisher, to travel to London to meet her public. Despite the extreme timidity that paralysed her among strangers and made her almost incapable of expressing herself, Charlotte consented to be lionised, and in London was introduced to other great writers of the era, including Harriet Martineau and William Makepeace Thackeray, both of whom befriended her. Charlotte especially admired Thackeray, whose portrait, given to her by Smith, still hangs in the dining room at Haworth parsonage.[[File:Crystal Palace interior.jpg|thumb|right|upright=1.0|Interior of The Crystal Palace, during the 1851 Great Exhibition]] On one occasion during a public gathering, Thackeray introduced Charlotte to his mother as Jane Eyre and when Charlotte called on him the next day, he received an extended dressing-down, in which Smith had to intervene.

During her trip to London in 1851 she visited the Great Exhibition and The Crystal Palace. In 1849 she published Shirley and in 1853 Villette.

 Marriage and death 

The Brontë sisters were highly amused by the behaviour of the curates they met. Arthur Bell Nicholls (1818–1906) had been curate of Haworth for seven and a half years, when contrary to all expectations, and to the fury of Patrick Brontë (their father), he proposed to Charlotte. Although impressed by his dignity and deep voice, as well as by his near complete emotional collapse when she rejected him, she found him rigid, conventional and rather narrow-minded "like all the curates"—as she wrote to Ellen Nussey. After she declined his proposal, Nicholls, pursued by the anger of Patrick Brontë, left his functions for several months. However, little by little her feelings evolved and after slowly convincing her father, she finally married Nicholls on 29 June 1854.

On return from their honeymoon in Ireland where she had been introduced to Mr. Nicholls' aunt and cousins, her life completely changed. She adopted her new duties as a wife, which took up most of her time. She wrote to her friends telling them that Nicholls was a good and attentive husband, but that she nevertheless felt a kind of holy terror at her new situation. In a letter to Ellen Nussey (Nell), in 1854 she wrote "Indeed-indeed-Nell-it is a solemn and strange and perilous thing for a woman to become a wife."

The following year she died aged 38. The cause of death given at the time was tuberculosis, but it may have been complicated with typhoid fever (the water at Haworth being likely contaminated due to poor sanitation and the vast cemetery that surrounded the church and the parsonage) and hyperemesis gravidarum from her pregnancy that was in its early stage.

The first biography of Charlotte was written by Elizabeth Cleghorn Gaskell at the request of Patrick Brontë, and published in 1857, helping to create the myth of a family of condemned genius, living in a painful and romantic solitude. After having stayed at Haworth several times and having accommodated Charlotte in Plymouth Grove, Manchester, and having become her friend and confidant, Mrs Gaskell certainly had the advantage of knowing the family.

 Novels 
 Jane Eyre (1847)
 Shirley (1849)
 Villette (1853)
 The Professor (1857)

 Unfinished fragments 
These are outlines or unedited roughcasts which with the exception of Emma have been recently published.
 Ashford, written between 1840 and 1841, where certain characters from Angria are transported to Yorkshire and are included in a realistic plot.
 Willie Ellin, started after Shirley and Villette, and on which Charlotte worked relatively little in May and July 1853, is a story in three poorly linked parts in which the plot at this stage remains rather vague.
 The Moores is an outline for two short chapters with two characters, the brothers Robert Moore, a dominator, and John Henry Moore, an intellectual fanatic.
 Emma, already published in 1860 with an introduction from Thackeray. This brilliant fragment would doubtlessly have become a novel of similar scope to her previous ones. It later inspired the novel A Little Princess by Frances Hodgson Burnett.
 The Green Dwarf published in 2003. This story was probably inspired by The Black Dwarf by Walter Scott of whose novels Charlotte was a fan. The novel is a fictional history about a war that breaks out between Verdopolis (the capital of the confederation of Glass Town) and Senegal.

 Branwell Brontë 

Patrick Branwell Brontë (1817–1848) was considered by his father and sisters to be a genius, while the book by Daphne du Maurier (1986), The Infernal World of Branwell Brontë, contains numerous references to his addiction to alcohol and laudanum. He was an intelligent boy with many talents and interested in many subjects, especially literature. He was often the driving force in the Brontë siblings' construction of the imaginary worlds. He was artistic and was encouraged by his father to pursue this.

While trying to make a name as an artist, he left for London, but used up his father's allowance in a matter of days in cafés of ill-repute. His attempts to obtain low-paid work failed, and very quickly he foundered in alcohol and laudanum, unable to regain his stability.

Anne Brontë obtained employment for him in January 1843, but nearly three years later he was dismissed. In September 1848, after several years of decline, he died from tuberculosis. On his death, his father tearfully repeated, "My brilliant boy", while the clearheaded and totally loyal Emily wrote that his condition had been "hopeless".

Branwell is the author of Juvenilia, which he wrote as a child with his sister Charlotte, Glass Town, Angria, poems, pieces of prose and verse under the pseudonym of Northangerland, such as "Real Rest", published by the Halifax Guardian (8 November 1846) from several articles accepted by local newspapers and from an unfinished novel probably from around 1845 entitled And the Weary are at Rest.

 Emily Brontë 

Emily Brontë (1818–1848) has been called the "Sphinx of Literature", writing without the slightest desire for fame and only for her own satisfaction. She was obsessively timid outside the family circle, to the point of turning her back on her partners in conversation without saying a word.

With a single novel, Wuthering Heights (1847), and poems with an elemental power, she reached the heights of literature. Though she was almost unknown during her life, posterity classes her as "top level" in the literary canon"The place of Wuthering Heights in the literary canon is assured" : see the synopsis of Wuthering Heights in the Critical commentary of Heather Glen, p. 351. of English literature. Simone de Beauvoir, in The Second Sex (1949), chooses only Emily Brontë, Virginia Woolf and ("sometimes") Mary Webb, Colette and Mansfield, as among those who have tried to approach nature "in its inhuman freedom".

Above all, Emily loved to wander about the wild landscape of the moors around Haworth. In September 1848 her health began to decline rapidly. Consumptive, she refused all treatment, with the exception of a visit from a London doctor, because although it was already too late, her relatives insisted. Despite popular belief, Emily did not die on the dining room sofa. There is no contemporary evidence for the story and Charlotte, in her letter to William Smith Williams, mentions Emily's dog Keeper lying at the side of her death bed. It is possible that she left an unfinished manuscript that Charlotte burned to avoid such controversy as followed the publication of Wuthering Heights. Several documents exist that allude to the possibility, although no proof corroborating this suggestion has ever been found.

 Emily Brontë's poems 

Emily's poems were probably written to be inserted in the saga of Gondal, several of whose characters she identified with right into adulthood. At the age of 28 she still acted out scenes from the little books with Anne while travelling on the train to York. "Remembrance" was one of the 21 of her poems that were chosen for 1846 joint publication with her siblings'.

 Anne Brontë 

Anne was not as celebrated as her other two sisters. Her second novel, The Tenant of Wildfell Hall, was prevented from being republished after Anne's death by her sister Charlotte, who wrote to her publisher that "it hardly appears to me desirable to preserve. The choice of subject in that work is a mistake, it was too little consonant with the character, tastes and ideas of the gentle, retiring inexperienced writer." This prevention is considered to be the main reason for Anne's being less renowned than her sisters.

Anne's health began to decline rapidly, like that of her brother and sister some months earlier. On 5 April 1849, she wrote to Ellen Nussey asking her to accompany her to Scarborough on the east coast. Anne confides her thoughts to Ellen:

Anne hoped that the sea air would improve her health, as recommended by the doctor, and Charlotte agreed to go.

On the Sunday morning she felt weaker and asked if she could be taken back to Haworth. The doctor confirmed that she was near to death and Anne thanked him for his candour. "Take courage, take courage" she murmured to Charlotte. She died at 2 pm on Monday 28 May. She is buried in the cemetery of St Mary's of Scarborough. Her gravestone inscription carried an error in her age: she died at the age of 29 and not at 28. It was noticed by Charlotte during her only visit, and she had the intention of asking the mason to correct it. Ill health did not leave him time to effect the repair and the tombstone remained in the same state until it was replaced by the Brontë Society in April 2013.

 Northern England at the time of the Brontës 
In her 1857 biography The Life of Charlotte Brontë, Mrs Gaskell begins with two explanatory and descriptive chapters. The first one covers the wild countryside of the West Riding of Yorkshire, the little village of Haworth, the parsonage and the church surrounded by its vast cemetery perched on the top of a hill. The second chapter presents an overview of the social, sanitary and economic conditions of the region.

 Social, sanitary and economic conditions in Haworth 
The death toll within the Brontë family was not unusual for the area, and left little impression on the village population, who were confronted with death on a daily basis. When Patrick Brontë arrived, the parish was suffering from unemployment. The men sought work in the quarries and local handicrafts. The only businesses were the pharmacy, which supplied Branwell, and John Greenwood's stationery store where the Brontës were the best customers.

Haworth's population grew rapidly during the first half of the 19th century, from hardly 1,000 to 3,365 in 50 years. The village did not have a sewage system and the well water was contaminated by faecal matter and the decomposition of bodies in the cemetery on the hilltop. Life expectancy was less than 25 years and infant mortality was around 41% for children under six months of age. Most of the population lived by working the poorly fertile land of the moors and supplemented their incomes with work done at home, such as spinning and weaving wool from the sheep that were farmed on the moors. Conditions changed when the textile industry, already present since the end of the 17th century, grew with the mills being located on the banks of the River Worth, whose waters turned the wheels. Consequently fewer people were needed to work them.

Food was scarce, often little more than porridge, resulting in vitamin deficiencies. Public hygiene was non-existent and lavatories were basic. The facilities at the parsonage were no more than a plank across a hole in a hut at the rear, with a lower plank for the children. In her thirties, Charlotte was described as having a toothless jaw by such persons as Mrs Gaskell, who stated in a letter dated 25 August 1850 to Catherine Winkworth: "large mouth and many teeth gone". However, food was reasonably plentiful in the family. They ate from well filled plates of porridge in the morning and piles of potatoes were peeled each day in the kitchen while Tabby told stories about her country, or Emily revised her German grammar. Sometimes Mr Brontë would return home from his tours of the village with game donated by the parishioners.

 Role of the women 

According to Robert Southey, poet laureate, in his response to Charlotte, ladies from a good background should be content with an education and a marriage embellished with some decorative talents. Mr Patrick Brontë had one of the characters in his The Maid of Kilarney—without knowing whether it reflected a widespread opinion supporting or condemning it—say, "The education of female ought, most assuredly, to be competent, in order that she might enjoy herself, and be a fit companion for man. But, believe me, lovely, delicate and sprightly woman, is not formed by nature, to pore over the musty pages of Grecian and Roman literature, or to plod through the windings of Mathematical Problems, nor has Providence assigned for her sphere of action, either the cabinet or the field. Her forte is softness, tenderness and grace." In any case, it seemed to contradict his attitude towards his daughters whom he encouraged, even if he was not completely aware of what they did with their time.

 Sisters' place in literature 
Due to their forced or voluntary isolation, the Brontë sisters constituted a separate literary group that neither had predecessors nor successors. There is not a 'Brontë' line such as exists among authors of realist and naturalist novels, or in poetry, the romantic and the symbolic.

Their influence certainly existed, but it is difficult to define in its totality. Writers who followed them doubtlessly thought about them while they were creating their dark and tormented worlds such as Thomas Hardy in Jude the Obscure or Tess of the d'Urbervilles, or George Eliot with Adam Bede and The Mill on the Floss. There were also more conventional authors such as Matthew Arnold, who in a letter from 1853 says of Charlotte that she only pretends to heartlessness: "nothing but hunger, rebellion and rage". In contrast, Mrs Humphry Ward, author of Robert Elsmere and other morality novels, only finds the didactic among the works of Charlotte, while she appreciates the happy blend of romance and realism in the works of Emily. There is however nothing that could constitute a literary vein.

 Pilgrimages to Haworth from 1860 
By 1860 Charlotte had been dead for five years, and the only people living at the parsonage were Mr. Brontë, his son-in-law, Arthur Bell Nicholls, and two servants. In 1857 Mrs. Gaskell's biography of Charlotte was published, and though at its first reading, Mr. Brontë approved of its commissioning, several months later he expressed doubts. The portrait of Nicholls, founded partly on the confidence of Ellen Nussey, seemed to him to be unjustified. Ellen Nussey, who hated Arthur, insists that his marital claims had perverted Charlotte's writing and she had to struggle against an interruption of her career. It is true that Arthur found Nussey to be too close to his wife, and he insisted that she should destroy her letters—although this never actually happened.

Mrs. Gaskell's book caused a sensation and was distributed nationwide. The polemic launched by Charlotte's father resulted in a squabble that only served to increase the family's fame.

During Charlotte's lifetime friends and sponsors visited the parsonage, including Sir James and Lady Kay Shuttleworth, Ellen Nussey, Elizabeth Gaskell, John Store Smith, a young writer from Manchester, Bessie Parkes, who recounted her visit to Mrs. Gaskell, and Abraham Holroyd, poet, antiquarian and historian. However, following the publication of the book and the pastor's public remonstrations, the parsonage became a place of pilgrimage for admirers wanting to see it with their own eyes. Charlotte's husband recalled that he had to protect his father-in-law, when on the short path to the church they had to push their way through the crowds of people wanting to reach out and touch the cape of the father of the Brontë girls. The hundreds of visitors became thousands, coming from all over Britain and even from across the Atlantic. Whenever he agreed to meet them, Patrick received them with utmost courtesy and recounted the story of his brilliant daughters, never omitting to express his displeasure at the opinions held about Charlotte's husband.

The flow of visitors has never abated. Indeed, the parsonage at Haworth received an estimated 88,000 visitors in 2017.

 Brontë Society 
The Brontë Parsonage Museum is managed and maintained by the Brontë Society, which organises exhibitions and takes care of the cultural heritage represented by objects and documents that belonged to the family. The society has branches in Australia, Canada, France, Ireland, the Scandinavian countries, South Africa and the USA.

 Haworth 
In 1904, Virginia Woolf visited Haworth and published an account in The Guardian on 21 December. She remarked on the symbiosis between the village and the Brontë sisters, and on the fact that utensils and clothes that would normally have disappeared before those who used them, have survived, enables one to better understand their singular presence. She wrote: "Haworth expresses the Brontës; the Brontës express Haworth; they fit like a snail to its shell".

 Descendants 
The line of Patrick Brontë died out with his children, but Patrick's brother had notable descendants, including James Brontë Gatenby, whose most important work was studying Golgi bodies in various animals, including humans, and Peter Gatenby, the medical director of the UN.

 In popular culture 

 Books, comics and graphic novels 

 In Catherynne M. Valente's young-adult fiction novel The Glass Town Game (2017), "Glass Town turns into a Narnia-like world of its own, and the Brontës find themselves pulled through into their own creation".
In the comic series Die (2018) by writer Kieron Gillen and artist Stephanie Hans, three of the locations on the icosahedron shaped world are Gondal, Angria and Glass Town based on the Brontë juvenilia. In issue #9, Charlotte is a narrative character and reveals the connection between the world of Die, her siblings and their paracosms. Charlotte is also featured on the cover of the issue.
In the graphic novel Glass Town (2020) by Isabel Greenberg, parts of the Brontë juvenilia are retold and intersected with the lives of four Brontë children—Charlotte, Branwell, Emily and Anne, as they explore the imaginary world they created. "Greenberg blurs fiction and memoir: characters walk between worlds and woo their creators. [...] This is a tale, bookended by funerals, about the collision between dreamlike places of possibility and constrained 19th-century lives".

 Cinema 
 In the American short film Three Sisters of the Moors (1944) by John Larkin, Molly Lamont plays Charlotte Brontë, Lynne Roberts plays Emily Brontë, and Heather Angel plays Anne Brontë.
 In the American film Devotion (1946) by Curtis Bernhardt, which constitutes a biography of the Brontë sisters, Ida Lupino plays Emily, Olivia de Havilland plays Charlotte, and Nancy Coleman plays Anne.
 In the French film Week-end (1967) by Jean-Luc Godard, Emily Brontë appears in a scene where one of the protagonists asks for geographical information.
 In the French film Les Sœurs Brontë (1979) by André Téchiné, Isabelle Adjani plays Emily, Marie-France Pisier plays Charlotte, Isabelle Huppert plays Anne, Patrick Magee plays Patrick Brontë, and Pascal Greggory plays Branwell Brontë.
 In the Canadian film The Carmilla Movie (2017) by Spencer Maybee, Grace Lynn Kung plays Charlotte and Cara Gee plays Emily.
 In the British/American film Emily (2022) by Frances O'Connor, Emma Mackey plays Emily, Alexandra Dowling plays Charlotte, and Amelia Gething plays Anne.

Dance
 Several 20th-century choreographic works have been inspired by the lives and works of the Brontë sisters.
 Dancer Gillian Lynne presented a composition titled The Brontës (1995).

Music
 Wuthering Heights is presented as John Lennon's favourite book in The Sky is Everywhere, a young adult fiction novel by author Jandy Nelson.
 English singer-songwriter Kate Bush released a song titled "Wuthering Heights" in 1978 to critical success. Coincidentally, Bush and Emily share the same birthday, 140 years apart.Glass Town, a 2021 meta rock musical by Miriam Pultro, features the "Brontë siblings as band members: Anne as the modern, feminist neosoul star; Emily as the alt-rock prodigy; Branwell, singing the blues; and Charlotte, the passionate rocker frontwoman".

Objects in outer space
 Charlottebrontë is the name of asteroid #39427, discovered at the Palomar Observatory, located on Palomar Mountain in southern California, on 25 September 1973. The asteroids #39428 and #39429 (both discovered on 29 September 1973, at Palomar Observatory) are named Emilybrontë and Annebrontë respectively.
 The 60 km-diameter impact crater Brontë on the surface of the planet Mercury is named in honour of the Brontë family.

 Opera 
 Wuthering Heights has been the subject of at least three completed operas of the same name: Bernard Herrmann wrote his version between 1943 and 1951, and Carlisle Floyd's setting was premiered in 1958. Frédéric Chaslin also wrote an operatic version. Frederick Delius also started work on a Wuthering Heights opera but abandoned it early.

 Sport 
 In 2018, a new horse race at York Racecourse was named the Brontë Cup in honour of the family.

 Stage productions 
 The play Brontë (2005), by Polly Teale, explores their lives as well as the characters they created.
 The musical Schwestern im Geiste (2014; Sisters in Spirit), by Peter Lund, is about the Brontës.

 Television 
 In the Family Guy episode "New Kidney in Town", a cutaway gag shows Charlotte and Emily congratulating each other on their literary achievements, while Anne is shown as a crude simpleton (implying her literary contributions were negligible compared to her sisters).
 In the short-lived MTV animated series Clone High, the Brontë sisters were recurring background characters. In the season finale, "Changes: The Big Prom: The Sex Romp: The Season Finale", they go out as Clone JFK's prom dates, along with Catherine the Great and Joan of Arc. Later on, he states that he gave them away to The Three Stooges.
The creators of Clone High, Phil Lord and Christopher Miller previously made a failed pilot entitled “Super X-Treme Mega History Heroes” where it depicts a fictional toy line where the three sister action figures morph together into “Brontësaurus” à la other action figure toys such as Transformers and Power Rangers.
 In the episode "Educating Doug" of the American television series The King of Queens, Doug and Carrie enrol in a course on classic literature to improve their level of sophistication. They are assigned the book Jane Eyre where Doug struggles to get past even the second page.
 In the episode of CBBC children's television show Horrible Histories entitled "Staggering Storytellers", Charlotte (Jessica Ransom), Emily (Gemma Whelan), Anne (Natalie Walter) and Branwell (Thom Tuck) try to get their work published, forgetting all about the Brontë brother.
 In 2016 a BBC TV drama, To Walk Invisible, was made about the initial success of their novels and the death of Branwell.
 In 2018, a TV sitcom series, Mom'', episode titled, "Charlotte Brontë and a Backbone", references being a college educated waitress who knows the difference between Charlotte and Emily.

References 
Informational notes

Citations

Bibliography

External links 

 Brontë Society
 The Brontës

 
English women poets
Victorian novelists
Victorian women writers
English people of Irish descent
People from Thornton and Allerton